Isleria is a genus of insectivorous birds in the antbird family, Thamnophilidae.

Species
The genus contains two species:

These species were formerly placed in the genus Myrmotherula. A molecular genetic study published in 2012 found that Myrmotherula was not monophyletic. As a step in creating monophyletic genera, these two species were moved to the newly erected genus Isleria. The name of the genus was chosen to honour the American ornithologists Morton and Phyllis Isler.

References

External links

 
Bird genera